Data security  means protecting digital data, such as those in a database, from destructive forces and from the unwanted actions of unauthorized users, such as a cyberattack or a data breach.

Technologies

Disk encryption 

Disk encryption refers to encryption technology that encrypts data on a hard disk drive.  Disk encryption typically takes form in either software (see disk encryption software) or hardware (see disk encryption hardware). Disk encryption is often referred to as on-the-fly encryption (OTFE) or transparent encryption.

Software versus hardware-based mechanisms for protecting data 

Software-based security solutions encrypt the data to protect it from theft. However, a malicious program or a hacker could corrupt the data to make it unrecoverable, making the system unusable. Hardware-based security solutions prevent read and write access to data, which provides very strong protection against tampering and unauthorized access.

Hardware-based security or assisted computer security offers an alternative to software-only computer security. Security tokens such as those using PKCS#11 or a mobile phone may be more secure due to the physical access required in order to be compromised. Access is enabled only when the token is connected and the correct PIN is entered (see two-factor authentication). However, dongles can be used by anyone who can gain physical access to it. Newer technologies in hardware-based security solve this problem by offering full proof of security for data.

Working off hardware-based security: A hardware device allows a user to log in, log out and set different levels through manual actions. The device uses biometric technology to prevent malicious users from logging in, logging out, and changing privilege levels. The current state of a user of the device is read by controllers in peripheral devices such as hard disks. Illegal access by a malicious user or a malicious program is interrupted based on the current state of a user by hard disk and DVD controllers making illegal access to data impossible. Hardware-based access control is more secure than the protection provided by the operating systems as operating systems are vulnerable to malicious attacks by viruses and hackers. The data on hard disks can be corrupted after malicious access is obtained. With hardware-based protection, the software cannot manipulate the user privilege levels. A hacker or a malicious program cannot gain access to secure data protected by hardware or perform unauthorized privileged operations. This assumption is broken only if the hardware itself is malicious or contains a backdoor. The hardware protects the operating system image and file system privileges from being tampered with. Therefore, a completely secure system can be created using a combination of hardware-based security and secure system administration policies.

Backups 

Backups are used to ensure data that is lost can be recovered from another source. It is considered essential to keep a backup of any data in most industries and the process is recommended for any files of importance to a user.

Data masking

Data masking of structured data is the process of obscuring (masking) specific data within a database table or cell to ensure that data security is maintained and sensitive information is not exposed to unauthorized personnel. This may include masking the data from users (for example so banking customer representatives can only see the last four digits of a customer's national identity number), developers (who need real production data to test new software releases but should not be able to see sensitive financial data), outsourcing vendors, etc.

Data erasure

Data erasure is a method of software-based overwriting that completely wipes all electronic data residing on a hard drive or other digital media to ensure that no sensitive data is lost when an asset is retired or reused.

International laws and standards

International laws 

In the UK, the Data Protection Act is used to ensure that personal data is accessible to those whom it concerns, and provides redress to individuals if there are inaccuracies. This is particularly important to ensure individuals are treated fairly, for example for credit checking purposes. The Data Protection Act states that only individuals and companies with legitimate and lawful reasons can process personal information and cannot be shared. Data Privacy Day is an international holiday started by the Council of Europe that occurs every January 28. 

Since the General Data Protection Regulation (GDPR) of the European Union (EU) became law on May 25, 2018, organizations may face significant penalties of up to €20 million or 4% of their annual revenue if they do not comply with the regulation.  It is intended that GDPR will force organizations to understand their data privacy risks and take the appropriate measures to reduce the risk of unauthorized disclosure of consumers’ private information.

International standards 

The international standards ISO/IEC 27001:2013 and ISO/IEC 27002:2013 cover data security under the topic of information security, and one of its cardinal principles is that all stored information, i.e. data, should be owned so that it is clear whose responsibility it is to protect and control access to that data. The following are examples of organizations that help strengthen and standardize computing security:

The Trusted Computing Group is an organization that helps standardize computing security technologies.

The Payment Card Industry Data Security Standard (PCI DSS) is a proprietary international information security standard for organizations that handle cardholder information for the major debit, credit, prepaid, e-purse, automated teller machines, and point of sale cards.

The General Data Protection Regulation (GDPR) proposed by the European Commission will strengthen and unify data protection for individuals within the EU, whilst addressing the export of personal data outside the EU.

See also

 Copy protection
 Cyber-security regulation
 Data-centric security
 Data erasure
 Data masking
 Data recovery
 Digital inheritance
 Disk encryption
 Comparison of disk encryption software
 Identity-based security
 Information security
 IT network assurance
 Pre-boot authentication
 Privacy engineering
 Privacy law
 Raz-Lee
 Security breach notification laws
 Single sign-on
 Smart card
 Tokenization
 Transparent data encryption
 USB flash drive security

Notes and references

External links
 Getting Ready for New Data Laws - Local Gov Magazine
 EU General Data Protection Regulation (GDPR)
 Countering ransomware attacks

 
Data management